William Frederick Rieflin (September 30, 1960 – March 24, 2020) was an American musician. Rieflin came to prominence in the 1990s mainly for his work as a drummer with groups (particularly in the industrial rock and industrial metal scenes) such as Ministry, the Revolting Cocks, Lard, KMFDM, Pigface, Swans, Chris Connelly, and Nine Inch Nails. He worked regularly with R.E.M. following the retirement of Bill Berry in 1997. He was a member of King Crimson from 2013 until his death in 2020.

Career
Rieflin was born on September 30, 1960 (some sources say September 29) and began his professional career in his hometown of Seattle. In 1975, he was in The Telepaths, a band which played backup for a couple of live gigs by the pre-The Screamers band The Tupperwares.
He played drums for The Blackouts starting in 1979.  His bandmates included Mike Davidson, Paul Barker, Roland Barker and Erich Werner.  Eventually that band dissolved and Paul Barker joined the nascent Ministry. His earliest collaboration with Al Jourgensen was on the second single by the Revolting Cocks, "You Often Forget". 

Later, he participated in the creation of Ministry's album The Land of Rape and Honey, and was noted for his performance in the live video In Case You Didn't Feel Like Showing Up (alongside fellow drummer Martin Atkins).  His work with Ministry and its side projects lasted through to the mid-nineties, though he noted that he was never credited as a member of Ministry proper, always as an "other" musician.  Therefore, when he parted ways with the band during the Filth Pig sessions, he did not really quit since he was never an official member.

Rieflin helped Atkins kick off Pigface, the industrial collective that would grow to incorporate hundreds of artists, formed a friendship with labelmate Chris Connelly and founded First World Music. Like Connelly, Rieflin's work grew beyond his industrial roots. They collaborated on several recordings; two in particular, The Ultimate Seaside Companion (as "The Bells") and Largo, showcase Rieflin's keyboard skills.

Rieflin's solo debut, Birth of a Giant, featured him singing in something other than a background role, and also featured Robert Fripp.  Improvisations from these sessions turned up later on the CD The Repercussions of Angelic Behavior, which was credited to Rieflin, Fripp and Trey Gunn.

Rieflin appeared on all KMFDM records released from 1995 to 2003 as a drummer, programmer, vocalist and keyboardist.  He toured with the band as a bassist in 2002 in support of its comeback album, Attak and performed on the 2011 KMFDM album, WTF?!. He also drummed for Scott McCaughey's band, The Minus 5, which occasionally included guitarist Peter Buck.  Eventually Buck offered Rieflin the opportunity to sit in with R.E.M., who were missing a permanent drummer since the 1997 departure of Bill Berry. The band gave him the live drummer slot in its 2003 tour.  They later announced that Rieflin would fill the role indefinitely, though once again as a hired musician rather than as an official member. In recordings, Rieflin also contributed bouzouki, keyboards and guitars to the group, serving as an auxiliary member until R.E.M. disbanded in 2011.

Rieflin was key to forming an experimental ensemble named Slow Music in 2005 with Fred Chalenor, Hector Zazou, Matt Chamberlain, Peter Buck, and Robert Fripp; in this sextet Rieflin played synthesizers rather than drums. The group played a small handful of live dates in 2005 and 2006 and became inactive until 2014, when they played a few shows as a quintet due to Zazou's passing in 2008.  He was also involved in a music collaboration project entitled The Humans, which consisted of him, Chris Wong, Fripp and Toyah Willcox. The band performed a series of live dates in Estonia in Autumn 2007 and 2009, and released their debut album We are the Humans in 2009. Hector Zazou's 2010 album Corps Electriques featured Rieflin, as well as KatieJane Garside, Lone Kent and nu-jazz trumpeter Nils Petter Molvær.

Rieflin was a regular contributor to Swans ever since the 1995 album The Great Annihilator, and played an array of instruments on all their studio recordings since the band reformed in 2010 and released My Father Will Guide Me up a Rope to the Sky. Rieflin is listed as an "honorary Swan" on the band's 2012 album The Seer.

In 2012, Rieflin performed on drums for Robbie Williams's album Take the Crown. Later that year he produced the single Crush Vaccine for Atomic Bride.

In an online diary entry dated September 6, 2013, Robert Fripp announced a new lineup for King Crimson that included Rieflin as one of the band's three drummers. A few days after the first full-length live release of the band with Rieflin on board (Live in Toronto 2015), Fripp announced Rieflin's decision to take a sabbatical from the band, effective March 6, 2016, "a decision supported by all the Crimson Brothers."  In early 2017, Fripp announced that Rieflin would be returning alongside his replacement, Jeremy Stacey.  Due to Fripp's desire to stave off complacency after several years of touring, Rieflin "will be focusing on mellotron, keys and fairy dusting, rather than using drums as a main instrument" in the new Double Quartet configuration, thus becoming the band's first full-time keyboardist ever. For the US Autumn 2017 tour dates in October–November, he was replaced on keyboards by the Seattle-based guitarist Chris Gibson. He rejoined in 2018 before taking another indefinite sabbatical in 2019, he was replaced on keyboards by Soft Machine's sax player Theo Travis., who was fired after a few rehearsals. Fripp and the band made the decision to not replace Rieflin, thus reverting King Crimson to a seven-member band.

Personal life and death

Rieflin was married to painter Francesca Sundsten until her death in 2019. Rieflin died on March 24, 2020 from colon cancer at the age of 59.

Discography
Cells with thistle-colored daggers indicate a live release

References

External links
 Bill Rieflin credits at AllMusic
 
 First World Music
 Bill Rieflin interview (March 2000) for QRD

1960 births
2020 deaths
American male singers
American rock drummers
American industrial musicians
KMFDM members
Musicians from Seattle
Singers from Washington (state)
Pigface members
Swans (band) members
Ministry (band) members
R.E.M. personnel
The Minus 5 members
Discipline Global Mobile artists
Revolting Cocks members
Lard (band) members
20th-century American drummers
American male drummers
21st-century American keyboardists
Deaths from cancer in the United States
Filthy Friends members
Deaths from colorectal cancer